Isibeal Carolan "Izzy" Atkinson (born 17 July 2001) is an Irish professional footballer who plays for English Women's Super League club West Ham United and has appeared for the Republic of Ireland women's national team. She previously played for Shelbourne in Ireland before joining Celtic in 2021.

Club career
Atkinson played youth football for Rush Athletic and the Metropolitan Girls' League Academy, before spending three years with Enniskerry FC. She signed for Women's National League (WNL) club Shelbourne in July 2017.

The 2020 WNL season, delayed by the COVID-19 pandemic, began with Atkinson in excellent form for Shelbourne. Instead of occupying her usual position on the wing, she had been repurposed as an attacking left-back. Her goal against Bohemians was named Goal of the Month for August 2020.

In February 2021, Atkinson signed for Scottish Women's Premier League club Celtic. She featured in Celtic's 2021–22 UEFA Women's Champions League matches, creating an equaliser against FC Minsk following a solo dribble down the pitch. In May 2022 she scored an extra time winning goal in the Scottish Women's Cup final, as Celtic beat rivals Glasgow City 3–2.

In July 2022, Atkinson and another young Irish player Tyler Toland both left Celtic. Atkinson then joined English Women's Super League club West Ham United later that month.

International career
In October 2017, Republic of Ireland national team coach Colin Bell named 16-year-old Atkinson in his squad for a FIFA Women's World Cup qualifying fixture in Slovakia. She won her first senior cap as a 90th-minute substitute for Leanne Kiernan in a 3–1 friendly win over Portugal at the Estádio de São Miguel, Ponta Delgada, on 22 January 2018.

Atkinson's first competitive appearance for Ireland was in a 1–0 FIFA Women's World Cup qualifying defeat in Norway in June 2018. She was an 89th-minute substitute for Áine O'Gorman and was shown the yellow card. She started her first match in a 1–0 friendly defeat by Belgium, staged in Murcia, Spain, on 20 January 2019.

References

External links
 
 
 

2001 births
Living people
Republic of Ireland women's association footballers
Republic of Ireland women's international footballers
Women's association football forwards
Women's National League (Ireland) players
Shelbourne F.C. (women) players
Association footballers from County Dublin
Celtic F.C. Women players
Expatriate women's footballers in Scotland
Republic of Ireland expatriate association footballers
Irish expatriate sportspeople in Scotland
Scottish Women's Premier League players
West Ham United F.C. Women players
Women's Super League players
Expatriate women's footballers in England
Irish expatriate sportspeople in England